S.T.R.A.H. (trans. F.E.A.R.) is a Serbian and Yugoslav rock band formed in  Belgrade in 1985.

In the several years after the formation the band performed rarely, but managed to gain cult status with its horror-influenced songs. They released one EP and disbanded at the beginning of Yugoslav Wars, while recording their debut album. In 2016 the band reunited, releasing their first full-length album in 2019.

History

1985–1991
Inspired by American garage rock and British pub rock acts, Milutin Krstić (vocals), Željko Debeljević (guitar, vocals), Aleksandar Žikić (at the time a well-known music journalist, guitar), Saša Ristić (bass guitar) and Nenad Ivković (drums) formed the band S.T.R.A.H. The band chose their name after a fictional secret organization from the British comic The Steel Claw.

A year after the formation, Krstić left the band, so Debeljević took over lead vocals. The band performed rarely, but managed to gain cult status. In 1988, the band released their only release, the EP Mesec (The Moon), through Produkcija Slovenija record label. The EP, produced by Dušan Kojić "Koja" of Disciplina Kičme, featured four songs, "Mesec (Lunarni Mix)" ("The Moon ("Lunar Mix)"), "Mesec (Vampire State Dub Mix)", "Noćas" ("Tonight") and "Vudu lutka" ("Voodoo Doll"). The songs' lyrics were horror-influenced, and the album artwork featured horror images and the inscription Metus dominus unus est (Latin for "Fear Is the Only Master"). The back cover featured the logo and the address of the Count Dracula Fan Club from New York City.

After the release of the EP, Ivković was replaced by Aleksandar Timofejev. With the outbreak of Yugoslav Wars, the band disbanded while in the middle of recording their full-length début, Ristović and Debeljević emigrating to Canada.

Post breakup
Žikić continued his career as a journalist, writing for music magazines and working on television and radio. He wrote theatre plays Elvira je kul (Elvira Is Cool), Overdouz (transliteration for Overdose) and Ples aveti (The Dance of the Spectres). He wrote music books Fatalni ringišpil: Hronika beogradskog rokenrola 1959 - 1979 (Fatal Carousel: The Cronicle of Belgrade Rock 'n' Roll 1959, 1979, 1999), Mesto u mećavi: Priča o Milanu Mladenoviću (A Spot in the Blizzard: The Story of Milan Mladenović, 1999), and a book about whiskey entitled Vatra iz vode (Fire from Water, 2003). He also wrote a pull-out book Electrodeo: Almanah nove američke muzike (Electrodeo - The Almanac of New American Music), published by magazine NON.

Timofejev was a journalist on RTV Studio B, later moving to Radio B92 and eventually becoming program editor on TV B92. For a time he hosted his own talk show, Timofejev.

2016–present
In 2016, after a 25 years long hiatus, three members of the last incarnation of S.T.R.A.H., Debeljević, Žikić and Timofejev, reunited, with new bass player, Miloš Marković "Felix". In June 2016, they played in Belgrade for the first time since 1991, at the closing of the Dok’n'Ritam musical documentary film festival. In September 2017 they had their first full concert since the reuinon, alongside fellow 1980s Belgrade garage rock band Petar Pan, in club Elektropionir in Belgrade.

In May 2019 the band released their first full-length release, the album Kvog! through Mascom record label. The album was, as the band's 1988 EP, produced by Dušan Kojić "Koja".

Legacy
The song "Mesec" was covered in 2021 by Serbian musician Miloš Ratker.

Discography

Studio albums
Kvog! (2019)

EPs
Mesec (1988)

References

External links 
 S.T.R.A.H. at Discogs

Serbian rock music groups
Serbian garage rock groups
Serbian gothic rock groups
Yugoslav rock music groups
Yugoslav gothic rock groups
Death rock groups
Musical groups from Belgrade
Musical groups established in 1985
Musical groups disestablished in 1991
1985 establishments in Yugoslavia